Karen Dyer, professionally known as Eva La Dare, is an American film and television and motion capture actress.

Career 

Eva La Dare is known mainly for providing the voices for Sheva Alomar in Resident Evil 5 and Elena in the Street Fighter franchises. Born in Brooklyn, she is of Jamaican and Irish heritage. She currently lives in Los Angeles, California. Dyer was raised in Fort Lauderdale, Florida.

Filmography

Film

Television

Video games

References

External links
 

1970 births
Living people
African-American actresses
American people of Irish descent
American voice actresses
American television actresses
American film actresses
American video game actresses
People from Brooklyn
Actresses from New York City
20th-century American actresses
21st-century American actresses
20th-century African-American women
20th-century African-American people
21st-century African-American women
21st-century African-American people